Xylota conformis is a species of hoverfly in the family Syrphidae.

Distribution
Malaysia, Philippines.

References

Eristalinae
Insects described in 1857
Diptera of Asia
Taxa named by Francis Walker (entomologist)